The ZIL-118 Yunost (Youth) was a microbus built by Zavod imeni Likhachova (Russian: Завод имени Лихачёва, Factory named for Likhacov), or ZIL.

Based on the ZIL-111 limousine, the ZIL-118 Yunost (Youth) was developed in 1961, on the factory's own initiative. Only 20 were built because of a lack of interest of government. The few built were solely to special order, with a number as high-capacity ambulances. An updated version appeared in 1970 in several versions: the 118K coach 118KS ambulance, both using the ZIL-508.10 V8 from ZIL trucks.

The ZIL-118 was further facelifted in the 1980s, becoming the ZIL-3207. Production ended in 1994, with total number built, of the 118K/KS and 3207, reaching only 86.

Variants 
ZIL-118A: Ambulance version of ZIL-118.
ZIL-119 (ZIL-118K): Modernized ZIL-118.
ZIL-119A (ZIL-118KA): Ambulance version of ZIL-119.
ZIL-3302: Prototype truck based on ZIL-119.

Notes

Sources 
 Thompson, Andy. Cars of the Soviet Union. Somerset, UK: Haynes Publishing, 2008.

 

Cars of Russia
118
Soviet automobiles
Soviet brands
Cars introduced in 1965